Pandora's Promise is a 2013 documentary film about the nuclear power debate, directed by Robert Stone. Its central argument is that nuclear power, which still faces historical opposition from environmentalists, is a relatively safe and clean energy source that can help mitigate the serious problem of anthropogenic global warming.

The title is derived from the ancient Greek myth of Pandora, who released numerous evils into the world, yet as the movie's tagline recalls: "At the bottom of the box she found hope."

People

The movie features several notable individuals who were once vehemently opposed to nuclear power but who now speak in favor of it, including Stewart Brand, Gwyneth Cravens, Mark Lynas, Richard Rhodes and Michael Shellenberger.

Anti-nuclear advocate Helen Caldicott is questioned and along with Harvey Wasserman appears briefly at the beginning. Historical clips of Jane Fonda, Ralph Nader and Amory Lovins speaking are used.

Richard Branson is credited as an executive producer, as are Paul and Jody Allen, whose production company, Vulcan Productions, helped provide financial support. A total of $1.2 million (US) was raised to finance the film, "particularly through Impact Partners, which provides documentary financing from individual investors. Mr. Stone said the money came mainly from wealthy who have worked in Silicon Valley."

Topics

Topics mentioned or discussed in the film include:

 dosimetry
 background radiation
 naturally occurring radioactive material
 Guarapari, Brazil: monazite-bearing black sand beach
 Radium Springs, New Mexico: radium-rich water
 banana equivalent dose
 dosimeter
 tritium
 effects of global warming
 history of the anti-nuclear movement
 history of nuclear weapons
 atomic bombings of Hiroshima and Nagasaki
 Megatons to Megawatts Program
 nuclear proliferation
 nuclear weapons testing
 nuclear and radiation accidents
 Three Mile Island accident
 Chernobyl disaster
 Chernobyl: Consequences of the Catastrophe for People and the Environment (publication)
 Fukushima Daiichi nuclear disaster
 nuclear power in France
 nuclear power in the United States
 Shoreham Nuclear Power Plant
 Vermont Yankee Nuclear Power Plant
 nuclear reactors
 generation III reactor
 generation IV reactor
 integral fast reactor
 Experimental Breeder Reactor I
 Experimental Breeder Reactor II
 small modular reactor
 thorium fuel cycle
 traveling wave reactor
 
 Hyman G. Rickover

Multimedia

Stock footage and movie clips are used throughout Pandora's Promise to enhance the narrative. Scenes are shown of a No Nukes concert (1979), Margaret Thatcher addressing the United Nations General Assembly (1989), and from the drafting of the Kyoto Protocol (1997). Movie/TV sources include: A Is for Atom (1953), Our Friend the Atom (1957), The China Syndrome (1979), and The Simpsons (1991).

The film poster depicts a piece of metallic enriched uranium ("actual size" as printed) with the caption "What if this cube could power your entire life?"

Release

In January 2013 it was shown at the 2013 Sundance Film Festival. In March 2013 it was shown at the True/False Film Festival. In June 2013 it won the Sheffield Doc/Fest Green Award for best addressing environmental challenges.

In April 2013, it was announced that CNN Films had obtained the US television rights to Pandora's Promise; it was shown on CNN in the US on November 7, 2013, and seen by 345,000 viewers. It was released on Region 2 DVD in December 2013. A DVD via Alive Mind Cinema was announced for 24 June 2014. It is also available via various digital distribution services.

Reactions

Reactions to the film were generally positive, albeit with loud criticism from some quarters; e.g.:

 Kennette Benedict from the Bulletin of the Atomic Scientists states: "Nuclear power may indeed end up being part of the energy mix that leads to both a more stable climate and adequate livelihoods around the world. But the challenges posed by nuclear power – like the risk of weapons proliferation and reactor accidents, and the need to securely store radioactive used fuel for many generations – are not adequately addressed in the film."
 Manohla Dargis wrote a somewhat critical review.
 Friends of the Earth Australia, an environmental organization, has (among other groups) denounced the movie as "propaganda".
 Owen Gleiberman lauded it as "radically sane".
 Robert F. Kennedy, Jr. characterized it as an "elaborate hoax" and a "big lie".
 Edwin Lyman of the Union of Concerned Scientists was critical of various "less-than-half truths".
 Michael Moore discussed the film (among other topics) with director Robert Stone in front of an audience at the Traverse City Film Festival in July 2013.
 John Quiggin comments that Pandora's Promise presents the environmental rationale for nuclear power, but that reviving nuclear power debates is a distraction, and the main problem with the nuclear option is that it is not economically viable. Quiggin says that we need more energy efficiency and more renewable energy commercialization.
 David Ropeik found it praiseworthy.
 Christine Todd Whitman described it as "a very important, impactful film that should be seen by as wide an audience as possible."
 Terry Tempest Williams stated "this film's strength was not that it changed my mind, which it did not, but that it expanded it".
 Eric Zorn noted shortcomings, but hailed it as "the most important movie about the environment since An Inconvenient Truth".

See also
 Energy policy in the United States
 List of films about nuclear issues
 List of books about nuclear issues
 List of pro-nuclear environmentalists
 James Hansen
 Stephen Tindale
 Nuclear engineering
 Nuclear renaissance
 World energy consumption

Notes

References

External links
 
  (Pandora's Promise's channel)
 
 CNN Films: Pandora's Promise
 Transcript from CNN's airing
 Pandora's Promise free to watch online (in Australia only), from The Age.
 , answering questions about the film at the FCCJ, in 2013.
 The Education of an Environmentalist by Robert Stone, 2016.

2013 in the environment
2013 films
Documentary films about nuclear technology
Nuclear history
Films directed by Robert Stone
Vulcan Productions films
2010s English-language films